Ulva chaetomorphoides is a species of tropical and benthic seaweed in Ulvaceae family that can be found in Gulf of Mexico and European waters.

References

Ulvaceae
Plants described in 2003
Flora of Europe
Flora of North America